Road speed limits in Italy are used to define the maximum legal speed limit for road vehicles using public roads in Italy. The speed limit in each location is usually indicated on a nearby traffic sign. Signs show speed limits in kilometres per hour (km/h).

Speed limits

References

Sources
 Italian Highway Code (Codice della Strada)

Italy
Transport in Italy